"Running in the Family" is a single released in 1987 by the British band Level 42, from the album Running in the Family. It was then popped up for the release of the single which had significant success, reaching #6 on the UK Singles Chart and #9 in New Zealand, but only reaching #83 in the United States. It was part of a series of single successes by the group and brought Level 42 fame in countries where they were previously little-known, such as the United States, Germany and Norway.

Music video
The music video was recorded on a multi-coloured platform, which rotated in the same manner as a vinyl record. It features all the contemporary members of the band: Mark King, Mike Lindup, Boon Gould and Phil Gould. The musicians take turns in switching between "active" when they are performing, and "inactive", where they stand perfectly still as if a colored statue, when they are not. The video was produced by Wally Badarou.

Original Release

7": Polydor / POSP 842 (UK)
 "Running in the Family" - 3:57
 "Dream Crazy" - 3:50

12": Polydor / POSPX 842 (UK)
 "Running in the Family" (Extended Version) - 6:10
 "Dream Crazy" - 3:50
 "Running in the Family" (7" Version) - 3:57
 also available on German CD single (Polydor / 885 518-2)

12": Polydor / POSXX 842 (UK)
 "Running in the Family" (Extended Version) - 6:10
 "Dream Crazy" - 3:50
 "Running in the Family" (7" Version) - 3:57
 "World Machine" (Shep Pettibone Remix) - 5:39
 "World Machine" (Dub) - 5:00
 Limited edition 2x12" release

Charts

Weekly charts

Year-end charts

Cover versions
In 2007, Spanish singer José Galisteo covered the song on his debut album Remember.

References

1987 singles
1987 songs
European Hot 100 Singles number-one singles
Level 42 songs
Number-one singles in Denmark
Number-one singles in Israel
Polydor Records singles
Songs about families
Songs written by Mark King (musician)
Songs written by Phil Gould (musician)
Songs written by Wally Badarou